The 1966 United States Senate election in Nebraska took place on November 8, 1966. The incumbent Republican Senator, Carl Curtis, was re-elected by a wide margin over Governor of Nebraska Frank B. Morrison.

Democratic primary

Candidates
Raymond W. Arndt, candidate for U.S. Senate in 1964
Frank B. Morrison, Governor of Nebraska

Results

Republican primary

Candidates
Carl Curtis, the incumbent Senator

Results

Results

References 

1966
Nebraska
United States Senate